Pearl Gildersleeve Curran (Denver, Colorado, June 25, 1875 – New Rochelle, New York, April 16, 1941) was an American librettist and composer of art songs and works for chorus.

Biography
Pearl was born in Denver to J. H. and Elizabeth Tipton Heats Gildersleeve.  She was a descendant of settlers who had migrated to Colorado after the Civil War.  As a young girl she studied the violin, and later became interested in the piano.  She later attended University of Denver.  She also studied with Otto Pfeffercorn, Flora Smith Hunsicker and Martha Miner.

She settled in Larchmont, New York, and married Hugh Grosvenor Curran, a manufacturer in New York city. She was a member of ASCAP, the Pen Women’s Society and the Westchester County Music Festival Association.

Music
In 1912, she published Five Love Songs, and in the years that followed she wrote both the text and music to over 40 songs.  Many important  singers of the first half of the 20th century performed her works, including Enrico Caruso, Anna Case, and John Charles Thomas.  Victor Records recorded three of her songs in the 1920s.  Caruso premiered her song Life, and it was the only American composition on the choral program at the 1934 music festival in Budapest.  Her song Sonny Boy was transcribed into Braille for the blind during her lifetime, indicating its popularity at the time.  Her grandchildren, Patricia, Nancy, and Winfred B. Holton III inspired several of her songs, including In My Looking-Glass. At the end of her life, she developed the nationally broadcast radio program A Half Hour with Pearl Curran, for which she provided piano accompaniments to some of her most popular melodies.

She was adept at conveying the mood of the text with melody and accompaniment, ranging from the "serene love song" Nocturne and the "introspective" song Evening, to the more animated and descriptive song Rain, with short and repeated notes in the piano representing a rainy day. However, author Victoria Villamil accurately describes the dichotomy in her songs: "Unquestionably the greatest detriment to her work was her insistence on setting her own simplistic, old-fashioned texts.  Otherwise, her songs are imaginative, melodious, and well crafted.  Despite their naiveté, they can also be surprisingly elaborate and expansive."

Musical compositions
All published by G. Schirmer unless noted; texts are by the composer unless noted.

Secular songs for voice and piano 
A Bachelor's Lament (A whimsy), 1927
The Best is Yet to Be (text by Robert Browning), 1940
Bird Songs, 1932
Change o' Mind (An Irish Ballad), 1921
Contentment
The Crucifixion (sacred), 1925
Dawn (text by Feril Hess), 1917, published 1918
Evening
Five Songs, 1912, Carl Fischer Music
1. Love's Mystery
2. Twilight
3. When Thou Art Nigh
4. When I'm Alone
5. My Dearie
Flirtation, 1920, Oliver Ditson
Ho! Mr. Piper, 1919
The Holiday, 1919, Oliver Ditson
I Know (Encore Song), 1924
In Autumn
In My Looking-glass, 1931
Life (text by Mary Stewart Cutting), 1919
Nocturne, 1923
Nursery Rhymes, 1921
Pastorale
A Picture, 1922
Rain, 1920
Sonny Boy, 1919, Oliver Ditson
To Eostra (Spring song), 1924
To the Sun, 1920, Oliver Ditson
Two Idylls, 1921
1. Evening
2. A Pastorale
The Two Magicians, 1922
Two Meditations, 1922
1. Contentment (text by M. S. Cutting)
2. In Autumn
What is a Song? (A Query), 1928

Sacred songs for voice and piano 
Blessing (Thanksgiving song, text by Joan Secor), 1924
The Crucifixion
Gratitude (The Perfect Boon) (text by Earl B. Thomas), 1931
Hold Thou my hand, 1927
The Lord is My Shepherd (biblical text), 1921
Prayer (the Lord's Prayer)
The Resurrection, 1924

Choral arrangements
Bird Gossip, women's voices, 1939
Bird Songs, women's voices (arr. Carl Deis), 1935
Blessing, women's voices, 1924; mixed voices (arr. Keith Downing), 1946; mixed voices (arr. William Stickles), 1963
The Crucifixion, mixed voices (arr. Carl Deis), 1950
Dawn, women's voices, 1923; men's voices, 1923; mixed voices (arr. Carl Deis), 1927
Ho! Mr. Piper, mixed voices (arr. Ralph L. Baldwin), 1927
Life
Nocturne, women's voices (arr. Ducrest)
Nursery Rhymes, women's voices (arr. Carl Deis), 1948
Rain, women's voices (arr. Carl Deis), 1923
The Resurrection, mixed voices (arr. Carl Deis), 1949
The Two Magicians, women's voices (arr. Carl Deis)

Keyboard works
Blessing (Thanksgiving) (arr. William Stickles)
Wedding music (for piano or organ), 1922

Footnotes

References

.

1875 births
1941 deaths
Musicians from Denver
Songwriters from Colorado